Satkhira-1 is a constituency represented in the Jatiya Sangsad (National Parliament) of Bangladesh since 2014 by Mustafa Lutfullah of the Workers Party of Bangladesh.

Boundaries 
The constituency encompasses Kalaroa and Tala upazilas.

History 
The constituency was created in 1984 from the Khulna-13 constituency when the former Khulna District was split into three districts: Bagerhat, Khulna, and Satkhira.

Members of Parliament

Elections

Elections in the 2010s

Elections in the 2008s

Elections in the 1990s

References

External links
 

Parliamentary constituencies in Bangladesh
Satkhira District